Cifelliodon is an extinct genus of mammaliaforms from the Lower Cretaceous of North America. In the describing paper, it was considered one of the latest surviving haramiyids yet known, belonging to the family Hahnodontidae. Its discovery led to the proposal to remove hahnodontids from the larger well-known group, the multituberculates. However, later papers have considered it to be a basal allotherian outside of Haramiyida.

The sole species in the genus, Cifelliodon wahkarmoosuch, was found in the geological rock unit called the Yellow Cat Member, part of the Cedar Mountain Formation in Grand County, Utah. This rock unit dates to between 139-124 million years old. It was found alongside the remains of several dinosaurs - a large iguanodontian, a dromaeosaur, and an ornithopod - and parts of a crocodyliform.

Etymology
The genus name, Cifelliodon, means Cifelli's tooth, and honours the well-known mammal palaeontologist, Richard Cifelli. The species name, C. wahkarmoosuch comes from the Ute language, and means yellow (wahkar) cat (moosuch).

Description
The holotype of Cifelliodon wahkarmoosuch is an exceptionally well-preserved skull, housed at the Natural History Museum of Utah. 
The skull measures 70 mm in length, giving an estimated body mass of 0.91-1.27 kg. The skull is broad and shallow with a reduced tooth count. There is a prominent sagittal crest. Inside the skull on each side are two incisors, a canine, and four postcanines, all of them broken off at the gumline except for the last molars. These last molars had not yet erupted, and so their intact crowns allowed palaeontologists to identify this mammaliaform.

The preserved skull allowed palaeontologists to see the brain size of Cifelliodon, and they concluded it was a transitional size and shape between earlier stem mammals, and crown mammals. It appears to have had a well-developed sense of smell, as did most mammals in the Mesozoic.

Phylogeny
Previously, scientists had suggested that the hahnodontids belonged to the well-known group of mammals called multituberculates. However, examining the anatomy of Cifelliodon, Huttenlocker et al. (2018) found it to be closely related to Hahnodon, and placed them outside of Multituberculata and outside the crown mammals. This makes hahnodontids a late surviving stem mammal group. It also suggests that there were greater links between the tetrapod animals across the continents in the Cretaceous. Krause et al. (2020) recovered Cifelliodon as a basal member of Allotheria, outside of the clade containing Euharamiyida and 'Multituberculata + Gondwanatheria'. Their analysis did not include Hahnodon.

References

Haramiyida
Prehistoric cynodont genera
Early Cretaceous synapsids of North America
Fossil taxa described in 2018
Taxa named by Adam K. Huttenlocker
Taxa named by David M. Grossnickle
Taxa named by James I. Kirkland
Taxa named by Julia A. Schultz
Taxa named by Zhe-Xi Luo